The 1956 United States Army designation system was introduced by the United States Army to replace the designation system used by the United States Army Air Corps which had become the United States Air Force in 1948. It was used until the unified tri-service designation system for all services came into effect.

List of designations and use 

In 1956, the U.S. Army adopted a new, and relatively simple, designation system for its aviation assets. Aircraft were divided into three different types – 'A' for fixed-wing aircraft, 'H' for helicopters, or 'V' for V/STOL aircraft, and then were given a mission modifier, which, unlike the USAF system, came after the type code: 'C' for transports, 'O' for observation and reconnaissance aircraft, 'U' for utility types, and 'Z' for experimental aircraft. Aircraft types designated in this system were numbered sequentially.
For more information on the designation system, see 1956 United States Army aircraft designation system.

AC: Airplane, Cargo (1956–1962) 
 AC-1 Caribou – de Havilland Canada (redesignated CV-2 in 1962)
 AC-2 Buffalo – de Havilland Canada (redesignated CV-7 in 1962)

AO: Airplane, Observation (1956–1962) 
 AO-1 Mohawk – Grumman (redesignated OV-1 in 1962)
 AO-2 Inflatoplane – Goodyear
 AO-3 Inflatoplane – Goodyear

AU: Airplane, Utility (1956–1962) 
 AU-1 – de Havilland Canada (redesignated U-1 in 1962)

HC: Helicopter, Cargo (1956–1962) 
 HC-1 Sea Knight – Boeing Vertol (redesignated H-46 in 1962)
 HC-1B Chinook – Boeing Vertol (redesignated H-47 in 1962)

HO: Flying Platform (1956–1956) 
 HO-1 Pawnee – Hiller (redesignated VZ-1 in 1956)
 HO-2 – de Lackner (redesignated HZ-1 in 1956)

HO: Helicopter, Observation (1956–1962) 
 HO-1 – SNCASO
 HO-2 – Hughes
 HO-3 – Brantly
 HO-4 – Bell (redesignated H-4 in 1962)
 HO-5 – Fairchild Hiller (redesignated H-5 in 1962)
 HO-6 – Hughes (redesignated H-6 in 1962)

HU: Helicopter, Utility (1956–1962) 
 HU-1 Iroquois – Bell (redesignated H-1 in 1962)

HZ: Helicopter, Experimental (1956–1962) 
 HZ-1 Aerocycle – de Lackner Helicopters

VZ: Vertical Takeoff and Landing Research (1956–1962) 

 VZ-1 Pawnee – Hiller
 VZ-2 – Vertol
 VZ-3 Vertiplane – Ryan
 VZ-4 Convertiplane – Doak
 VZ-5 Fledgling – Fairchild
 VZ-6 – Chrysler
 VZ-7 – Curtiss-Wright
 VZ-8 Airgeep – Piasecki
 VZ-9 Avrocar – Avro Canada
 VZ-10 Hummingbird – Lockheed (redesignated V-4 in 1962)
 VZ-11 Vertifan – Ryan (redesignated as V-5 in 1962)
 VZ-12 Kestrel – Hawker Siddeley (redesignated as V-6 in 1962)

See also 
 United States military aircraft designation systems

References

Sources 

 

United States Army aviation
United States